In genetics a hypersensitive site is a short region of chromatin and is detected by its super sensitivity to cleavage by DNase I and other various nucleases (DNase II and micrococcal nucleases).  In a hypersensitive site, the nucleosomal structure is less compacted, increasing the availability of the DNA to binding by proteins, such as transcription factors and DNase I. These sites account for many inherited tendencies.

Location
Hypersensitive sites are found on every active gene, and many of these genes often have more than one hypersensitive site.  Most often, hypersensitive sites are found only in chromatin of cells in which the associated gene is being expressed, and do not occur when the gene is inactive.

In DNA being transcribed, 5'hypersensitive sites appear before transcription begins, and the DNA sequences within the hypersensitive sites are required for gene expression.  Note: hypersensitive sites precede active promoters.
 
Hypersensitive sites are generated as a result of the binding of transcription factors that displace histone octamers.

They can also be located by indirect end labelling. A fragment of DNA is cut once at the hypersensitive site with DNase and at another site with a restriction enzyme. The distance from the known restriction site to the DNase cut is then measured to give the location.

References

Genetics
Molecular biology